Brabender is a surname. Notable people with the surname include:

 Gene Brabender (1941–1996), American baseball player
 Wayne Brabender (born 1945), American-Spanish basketball player and coach
 John Brabender, American political consultant

See also
 Brabender plastograph, a device for the continuous observation of torque in the shearing of a polymer